This article lists secondary schools in Romania.

Alba County
 Horea, Cloșca and Crișan National College, Alba Iulia
 Dionisie Pop Marțian Economic College, Alba Iulia
 Apulum Technical College, Alba Iulia
 Alexandru Domșa Technical High School, Alba Iulia
 Saint Simion Ștefan Orthodox Theological Seminary, Alba Iulia
 , Aiud
 Titu Maiorescu National College, Aiud
 Avram Iancu Technical College, Aiud
 Alexandru Borza Agricultural Technological High School, Aiud
 Dr. Lazăr Chirilă High School, Baia de Arieș
 Inochentie Micu Clain National College, Blaj
 , Blaj
 Sfântul Vasile cel Mare Greek-Catholic Theological High School, Blaj
 Avram Iancu National College (Câmpeni) 
 David Prodan Theoretical High School, Cugir
 Ion D. Lăzărescu Technical College, Cugir
 Petru Maior Theoretical High School, Ocna Mureș
 Lucian Blaga National College, Sebeș
 Teiuș Theoretical High School
 Corneliu Medrea High School, Zlatna

Arad County

 Moise Nicoară National College, Arad
 , Arad
 Vasile Goldiș National College, Arad
 
 , Arad
 Adam Müller-Guttenbrunn High School, Arad
 Arad Technical High School for Constructions and Environmental Protection
 Caius Iacob High School of Electronics and Automation Technology, Arad
 Technological College of Food Industry, Arad
 Francisc Neumann Technological High School, Arad
 Iuliu Maniu Technological High School, Arad
 Iuliu Moldovan Technological High School, Arad
 Henri Coandă Auto Transport Technological High School, Arad
 Spiru Haret UCECOM High School, Arad
 Beliu Technological High School
 Cermei Theoretical High School
 Ion Creangă Technological High School, Curtici
 Ion Buteanu High School, Gurahonț
 Moga Voievod Technological High School, Hălmagiu
 Mihai Viteazul High School, Ineu
 Sava Brancovici Technological High School, Ineu
 Sever Bocu High School, Lipova
 Atanasie Marinescu High School, Lipova
 Vasile Juncu Technological High School, Miniș
 , Nădlac
 Gheorghe Lazăr Theoretical High School, Pecica
 Sântana Technological High School
 Săvârșin Technological High School
 Vinga Technological High School

Argeș County

 Ion Brătianu National College (Pitești)
 Zinca Golescu National College, Pitești
 , Pitești
 Ion Barbu Theoretical High School, Pitești
 Ion Cantacuzino Theoretical High School, Pitești
 Maria Teiuleanu Economic College, Pitești
 Armand Călinescu Technical High School, Pitești
 Costin D. Nenițescu Technical High School, Pitești
 , Pitești
 Dacia Technologic High School, Pitești
 Constantin Brâncuși Technologic High School, Pitești
 Dimitrie Dima Technologic High School, Pitești
 Dinicu Golescu National College, Câmpulung
 , Câmpulung
 Dan Barbilian Theoretical High School, Câmpulung
 Câmpulung Technical College
 Costești Technologic High School
 , Curtea de Argeș
 Ferdinand I Technologic High School, Curtea de Argeș
 King Michael I Technologic High School, Curtea de Argeș
 Constantin Dobrescu Technologic High School, Curtea de Argeș
 Iulia Zamfirescu Theoretical High School, Mioveni
 Victor Slăvescu Technologic High School, Rucăr
 , Ștefănești
 Ion Mihalache Theoretical High School, Topoloveni
 Topoloveni Technologic High School
 Vedea Technologic High School

Bacău County
 Ferdinand I National College, Bacău
 Vasile Alecsandri National College (Bacău)
 Saint Joseph National Catholic College, Bacău
 Mihai Eminescu College, Bacău
 Ion Ghica Economic College, Bacău
 Henri Coandă Theoretical High School, Bacău
 Anghel Saligny Technological High School, Bacău
 Grigore Antipa Technological High School, Bacău
 Ion Borcea Technical College, Buhuși
 Dimitrie Ghika Technical College, Comănești
 Dărmănești Technological High School
 Grigore Cobălcescu Technical College, Moinești
 Dimitrie Cantemir National College, Onești
 Grigore Moisil National College (Onești)
 Gheorghe Asachi Technical College, Onești
 Petru Poni Technological High School, Onești
 Nadia Comăneci Sports High School, Onești
 Alexandru Vlahuță Technological High School, Podul Turcului
 Costache Negri National College, Târgu Ocna
 Jacques M. Elias Technological High School, Sascut

Bihor County

 Emanuil Gojdu National College, Oradea
 Mihai Eminescu National College (Oradea)
 , Oradea
 Traian Vuia Technical College, Oradea
 Samuil Vulcan National College, Beiuș
 Gabriel Țepelea Theoretical High School, Borod
 Octavian Goga National College, Marghita
 Horváth János Theoretical High School, Marghita
 Horea Technological High School, Marghita
 Teodor Neș National College, Salonta
 Avram Iancu National College (Ștei)

Bistrița-Năsăud County

 Liviu Rebreanu National College, Bistrița
 Andrei Mureșanu National College (Bistrița)
 Corneliu Baba High School of Arts, Bistrița
 High School of Music, Bistrița
 Petru Rareș National College (Beclean)
 Henri Coandă Technological High School, Beclean
 Beclean Agricultural Technological High School
 George Coșbuc National College (Năsăud)
 Solomon Halita Theoretical High School, Sângeorz-Băi
 Constantin Romanu-Vivu Theoretical High School, Teaca

Botoșani County

 A. T. Laurian National College, Botoșani
 Mihai Eminescu National College (Botoșani)
 Anastasie Bașotă Theoretical High School, Botoșani
 Grigore Antipa Theoretical High School, Botoșani
 Alexandru cel Bun High School, Botoșani
 Dimitrie Negreanu High School, Botoșani
 Octav Onicescu Economics College, Botoșani
 Gheorghe Asachi Technical College, Botoșani
 Nicolae Iorga Pedagogical High School, Botoșani
 Petru Rareș Technological High School, Botoșani
 Elie Radu Technological High School, Botoșani
 Dimitrie Cantemir High School, Darabani
 , Dorohoi
 Regina Maria High School, Dorohoi
 Mihai Ciucă Theoretical High School, Săveni

Brașov County

 Áprily Lajos National College, Brașov
 Ioan Meșotă National College, Brașov
 Grigore Moisil National College of Computer Science (Brașov)
 Andrei Mureșanu High School, Brașov
 Unirea National College (Brașov)
 Greater Grace International Academy, Brașov
 Ioan Pascu Theoretical High School, Codlea
 Simion Mehedinți Technical High School, Codlea
 Radu Negru National College, Făgăraș
 Doamna Stanca National College (Făgăraș)
 Ioan Șenchea Technical High School, Făgăraș
 Mihail Săulescu Theoretical High School, Predeal
 Râșnov Technical High School
 Ștefan Octavian Iosif High School, Rupea
 George Moroianu Theoretical High School, Săcele
 István Zajzoni Rab Theoretical High School, Săcele
 Ion Codru-Drăgușanu Theoretical High School, Victoria

Brăila County

 Nicolae Bălcescu National College, Brăila
 Ana Aslan National College, Brăila
 Gheorghe Munteanu-Murgoci National College, Brăila
 Ion Ghica Economic College, Brăila
 George Vâlsan Theoretical High School, Brăila
 Panait Cerna Theoretical High School, Brăila
 Nicolae Iorga Theoretical High School, Brăila
 Mihai Sebastian Theoretical High School, Brăila
 Nicolae Oncescu Technological High School, Brăila
 Panait Istrati Technological High School, Brăila
 Grigore Moisil Technological High School, Brăila
 Gheorghe K. Constantinescu Technological High School, Brăila
 Anghel Saligny Technological High School, Brăila
 Edmond Nicolau Technological High School, Brăila
 Costin D. Nenițescu Technical High School, Brăila
 D.P. Perpessicius Pedagogical High School, Brăila
 George Vâlsan Theoretical High School, Făurei
 Constantin Angelescu Theoretical High School, Ianca
 Nicolae Titulescu Technological High School, Însurăței
 Matei Basarab Technological High School, Măxineni

Bucharest

 Gheorghe Lazăr National College (Bucharest)
 Saint Sava National College
 
 Mihai Viteazul National College (Bucharest)
 Tudor Vianu National College of Computer Science
 Matei Basarab National College (Bucharest)
 Cantemir Vodă National College
 Mihai Eminescu National College (Bucharest)
 Iulia Hasdeu National College (Bucharest)
 Gheorghe Șincai National College (Bucharest)
 
 
 
 Școala Centrală National College (formerly "Zoya Kosmodeyanskaya")
 Aurel Vlaicu National College
 Ion Neculce National College
 George Coșbuc Bilingual National College
 
 
 Alexandru Vlahuță Theoretical High School
 Constantin Brâncoveanu Theoretical High School
 Hristo Botev Theoretical High School
 Nicolae Iorga Theoretical High School
 Ștefan Odobleja Theoretical High School
 American International School of Bucharest
 International British School of Bucharest
 International Computer High School of Bucharest
 European School of Bucharest SEB
 Bucharest Christian Academy
 
 
 Edmond Nicolau Technical College

Buzău County

 Bogdan Petriceicu Hasdeu National College, Buzău
 Mihai Eminescu National College (Buzău)
 Alexandru Vlahuță National College, Buzău

Caraș-Severin County
 Traian Doda National College, Caransebeș
 Constantin Diaconovici Loga National College (Caransebeș)
 Hercules High School, Băile Herculane
 General Dragalina Theoretical High School, Oravița
 Bănățean High School, Oțelu Roșu
 Diaconovici-Tietz National College, Reșița
 Tata Oancea Theoretical High School, Reșița
 Traian Lalescu Theoretical High School, Reșița
 Traian Vuia Theoretical High School, Reșița

Călărași County

 Barbu Știrbei National College, Călărași
 Mihai Eminescu Theoretical High School, Călărași
 Ștefan Bănulescu Technical High School, Călărași
 Danubius High School, Călărași
 Sandu Aldea Agricultural College, Călărași
 Călărași Economics College
 Duiliu Zamfirescu Technological High School, Dragalina
 Fundulea Technologic High School
 Constantin George Călinescu Technologic High School, Grădiștea
 Alexandru Odobescu High School, Lehliu Gară
 Neagoe Basarab High School, Oltenița
 Ion Ghica Technologic High School, Oltenița
 Nicolae Bălcescu Technologic High School, Oltenița

Cluj County

 , Cluj-Napoca
 
 George Barițiu National College, Cluj-Napoca 
 , Cluj-Napoca
 Tiberiu Popoviciu High School of Computer Science, Cluj-Napoca
 
 , Cluj-Napoca
 , Cluj-Napoca
 John Sigismund Unitarian Academy, Cluj-Napoca
 , Cluj-Napoca
 
 Petru Maior Theoretical High School, Gherla
 Gherla Technologic High School

Constanța County

 Mircea cel Batrân National College, Constanța
 Mihai Eminescu National College (Constanța)
 Decebal High School, Constanța
 Ovidius High School, Constanța
 Dimitrie Leonida High School, Constanța
 Liceul Teoretic Național de Informatică, Constanța
 Callatis High School, Mangalia

Covasna County

 Mihai Viteazul National College (Sfântu Gheorghe)
 Székely Mikó National College, Sfântu Gheorghe
 Puskás Tivadar Technological High School, Sfântu Gheorghe
 Mikes Kelemen High School, Sfântu Gheorghe
 Plugor Sándor Art High School, Sfântu Gheorghe
 Reformed Theological High School (Sfântu Gheorghe)
 Berde Áron Technological High School, Sfântu Gheorghe
 Baróti Szabó Dávid Technological High School, Baraolt
 Kőrösi Csoma Sándor High School, Covasna
 Mircea Eliade Theoretical High School (Întorsura Buzăului)
 Nicolae Bălcescu Technological High School (Întorsura Buzăului)
 Nagy Mózes Theoretical High School, Târgu Secuiesc
 Bod Péter Pedagogical High School, Târgu Secuiesc
 Reformed Theological High School (Târgu Secuiesc)

Dâmbovița County
 Ienăchiță Văcărescu National College, Târgoviște

Dolj County

 Carol I National College, Craiova
 Frații Buzești National College, Craiova
 Elena Cuza National College (Craiova)
 Ștefan Odobleja Technological High School, Craiova

Galați County

 Vasile Alecsandri National College (Galați)
 Alexandru Ioan Cuza National College (Galați)
 Costache Negri National College, Galați
 Mihail Kogălniceanu National College, Galați
 Dunărea Theoretical High School, Galați
 Emil Racoviță Theoretical High School, Galați
 Mircea Eliade Theoretical High Schoo (Galați)
 Sfânta Maria Theoretical High School, Galați
 Aurel Vlaicu Technical High School, Galați
 Traian Vuia Technical High School, Galați
 Paul Dimo Technical High School, Galați
 Radu Negru Technical High School, Galați
 Anghel Saligny Technological High School, Galați
 Maritime Technological High School, Galați
 Railway Transport Technological High School, Galați
 Paul Bujor Technological High School, Berești
 Technological High School Nr. 1, Corod
 Technological High School Nr. 1, Cudalbi
 Hortensia Papadat Bengescu Technological High School, Ivești
 Costache Conachi Technological High School, Pechea
 Eremia Grigorescu Technological High School, Târgu Bujor
 Calistrat Hogaș National College, Tecuci
 Elena Caragiani Technological High School, Tecuci
 Ovid Caledoniu Technological High School, Tecuci
 Tudor Vladimirescu Technological High School, Tudor Vladimirescu

Giurgiu County
 Ion Maiorescu National College, Giurgiu
 Nicolae Cartojan Theoretical High School, Giurgiu
 Tudor Vianu Theoretical High School, Giurgiu
 Ion Barbu Technological High School, Giurgiu

Gorj County

 Tudor Vladimirescu National College, Târgu Jiu
 Ecaterina Teodoriu National College, Târgu Jiu
 Spiru Haret National College, Târgu Jiu
 Henri Coandă Technical College, Târgu Jiu
 Ion Mincu Technical College, Târgu Jiu
 Traian Vuia Auto College, Târgu Jiu
 General Gheorghe Magheru Technical College, Târgu Jiu
 Virgil Madgearu Economic College, Târgu Jiu
 Constantin Brăiloiu Music and Arts High School, Târgu Jiu
 Bârsești Technological High School, Târgu Jiu
 Baia de Fier Technological High School
 Bâlteni Technological High School
 Mihai Viteazul College, Bumbești-Jiu
 Roșia-Jiu Technological High School, Fărcășești
 George Coșbuc National College, Motru
 Motru Technical College
 Roșia de Amaradia Technological High School
 Gheorghe Tătărescu College, Rovinari
 Tudor Arghezi National College, Târgu Cărbunești

Harghita County
 Ernő Salamon High School, Gheorgheni
 Áron Márton National College, Miercurea Ciuc
 , Odorheiu Secuiesc

Hunedoara County

 Decebal National College, Deva
 Ion Mincu College, Deva
 Cetate National Sport College, Deva
 Transilvania Technical College, Deva
 Dragomir Hurmuzescu Energetic College, Deva
 Grigore Moisil School Group, Deva
 Sabin Drăgoi Pedagogical High School, Deva
 Traian Theoretical High School, Deva
 
 Avram Iancu National College (Brad)
 Iancu de Hunedoara National College, Hunedoara
 Traian Lalescu National College, Hunedoara
 Matei Corvin Technical College, Hunedoara
 Emanoil Gojdu Economic College, Hunedoara
 Telecommunications and Public Works School Group, Hunedoara
 Aurel Vlaicu High School (Orăștie)
 Mihai Eminescu Theoretical High School, Petroșani
 Hermes Economic College, Petroșani
 Dimitrie Leonida Technical College, Petroșani
 Informatics High School, Petroșani

Ialomița County
 Mihai Viteazul National College (Slobozia)
 , Urziceni

Iași County

National College (Iași)
Costache Negruzzi National College, Iași
Emil Racoviță National College, Iași
Mihai Eminescu National College (Iași)
Grigore Moisil Informatics High School, Iași
Octav Băncilă National College of Arts, Iași
Gheorghe Asachi Technical College, Iași
Ioan C. Ștefănescu Technical College, Iași
Vasile Lupu Pedagogical College, Iași
Economic Administrative College Iași
Gheorghe Mârzescu Technical College of Electronics and Telecommunications, Iași
Richard Wurmbrand College, Iași
Alexandru Ioan Cuza Theoretical High School, Iași
Dimitrie Cantemir Theoretical High School, Iași
Miron Costin Theoretical High School, Iași
Vasile Alecsandri Theoretical High School, Iași
Waldorf High School, Iași
Sports High School Iași
Ștefan cel Mare Theoretical High School, Hârlău
Mihail Sadoveanu Theoretical High School, Pașcani
Bogdan Vodă Hălăucești High School, Pașcani
Lascăr Rosetti Theoretical High School, Răducăneni
Ion Neculce Theoretical High School, Târgu Frumos

Ilfov County
 Traian Lalescu Theoretical High School, Brănești
 Cezar Nicolau Technological High School, Brănești
 Theodor Pietraru Forest College, Brănești
 Horia Hulubei Theoretical High School, Măgurele
 Ioan Petruș Theoretical High School, Otopeni
 Mihail Kogălniceanu Theoretical High School, Snagov
 Alexandru Rosetti Theoretical High School, Vidra
 Popești-Leordeni Theoretical High School
 Periș High School

Maramureș County

 Gheorghe Șincai National College (Baia Mare)
 Vasile Lucaciu National College, Baia Mare
 Mihai Eminescu National College (Baia Mare)
 Nicolae Titulescu Economics College, Baia Mare 
 Anghel Saligny Technical College, Baia Mare 
 Aurel Vlaicu Technical College, Baia Mare
 C.D. Nenițescu Technical College, Baia Mare
 George Barițiu Technical College, Baia Mare
 Transilvania Technical College, Baia Mare
 Baia Mare Arts High School
 Borșa High School
 Pintea Viteazul Economics College, Cavnic 
 Alexandru Filipașcu Technological College, Petrova
 Dragoș Vodă National College (Sighetu Marmației)
 King Ferdinand Pedagogic High School, Sighetu Marmației
 Taras Shevchenko Pedagogic High School, Sighetu Marmației
 Petru Rareș Theoretical High School, Târgu Lăpuș
 Grigore C. Moisil Technological College, Târgu Lăpuș
 Florian Ulmeanu Technological College, Ulmeni

Mehedinți County
 Traian National College, Drobeta-Turnu Severin,
 Gheorghe Țițeica National College, Drobeta-Turnu Severin
 , Drobeta-Turnu Severin
 National Pedagogical College Ștefan Odobleja, Drobeta-Turnu Severin

Mureș County

 Alexandru Papiu Ilarian National College, Târgu Mureș
 Unirea National College (Târgu Mureș)
 , Târgu Mureș
 
 
 , Târgu Mureș
 School on the Hill, Sighișoara

Neamț County
 Petru Rareș National College (Piatra Neamț)
 Gheorghe Asachi National College, Piatra Neamț
 Calistrat Hogaș National College, Piatra Neamț
 Roman-Vodă National College, Roman
 Ștefan cel Mare National College, Târgu-Neamț

Olt County

 Radu Greceanu National College, Slatina
 Ion Minulescu National College, Slatina
 Nicolae Titulescu Theoretical High School, Slatina
 Petre Pandrea Theoretical High School, Balș
 Ioniță Asan National College, Caracal
 Mihai Viteazul Theoretical High School, Caracal
 Alexandru Ioan Cuza Theoretical High School, Corabia
 Tudor Vladimirescu Theoretical High School, Drăgănești-Olt
 Ion Gheorghe Roșca Theoretical High School, Osica de Sus
 Ștefan Diaconescu High School, Potcoava

Prahova County

 
 Ion Luca Caragiale National College (Ploiești)
 Jean Monnet National College, Ploiești
 Virgil Madgearu Economic College, Ploiești 
 Spiru Haret High School, Ploiești
 Alexandru Ioan Cuza National College (Ploiești)
 Nichita Stănescu National College, Ploiești
 Lazăr Edeleanu Technical College, Ploiești
 , Ploiești
 Constantin Brâncoveanu Military School, Ploiești
 Toma N. Socolescu High School, Ploiești
 Victor Slăvescu Technologic, Administration and Service High School, Ploiești
 Bărcănești Agricultural Technologic High School
 , Breaza
 , Câmpina
 , Câmpina
 Simion Stolnicu High School, Comarnic
 Filipeștii de Pădure Theoretical High School 
 Ferdinand I College, Măneciu
 Tase Dumitrescu Technologic High School, Mizil
 Gheorghe Ionescu-Sisești Technologic High School, Valea Călugărească
 Carol I Technologic High School, Valea Doftanei

Satu Mare County
 Doamna Stanca National College (Satu Mare)
 Ioan Slavici National College, Satu Mare
 Kölcsey Ferenc National College, Satu Mare
 Mihai Eminescu National College (Satu Mare)
 UNIO High School, Satu Mare
 Gheorghe Dragoș College of Economics, Satu Mare
 János Hám Roman Catholic Theological School, Satu Mare
 Industrial School Group in Tășnad

Sălaj County
 Silvania National College, Zalău
 Alesandru Papiu Ilarian Technical College, Zalău
 Simion Bărnuțiu National College, Șimleu Silvaniei
 Iuliu Maniu Technical College, Șimleu Silvaniei

Sibiu County

 Gheorghe Lazăr National College (Sibiu)
 Samuel von Brukenthal National College, Sibiu
 Octavian Goga National College, Sibiu
 Andrei Șaguna National College (Sibiu)
 George Barițiu Economic College, Sibiu
 Onisifor Ghibu Theoretical High School, Sibiu
 Constantin Noica Theoretical High School, Sibiu
 Energy Technical College, Sibiu
 Cibinum Technical College, Sibiu
 Daniil Popovici Barcianu Agricultural College, Sibiu
 Avram Iancu Technological High School, Sibiu
 August Treboniu Laurian Technical College, Agnita
 Gustav Gundisch Theoretical High School, Cisnădie
 Cisnădie Technological High School
 Nicolae Teclu Technological High School, Copșa Mică
 Timotei Cipariu High School, Dumbrăveni
 Dumbrăveni Theoretical High School
 Axente Sever Theoretical High School, Mediaș
 Stephan Ludwig Roth Theoretical High School, Mediaș
 Mediensis Technical College, Mediaș
 Automecanica Technological College, Mediaș
 National School of Gas College, Mediaș
 Ilie Măcelariu Technological High School, Miercurea Sibiului
 Ioan Lupaș Technological High School, Săliște
 Johannes Lebel Technological High School, Tălmaciu

Suceava County

 Dragoș Vodă National College (Câmpulung Moldovenesc)
 , Câmpulung Moldovenesc
 Eudoxiu Hurmuzachi National College, Rădăuți
 
 , Suceava
 , Suceava
 , Suceava

Teleorman County
 Alexandru D. Ghica National College, Alexandria
 Alexandru Ioan Cuza Theoretical High School, Alexandria
 Constantin Noica Theoretical High School, Alexandria
 Olteni Theoretical High School
 Piatra Theoretical High School
 Anastasescu National College, Roșiorii de Vede
 Anghel Saligny Technical High School, Roșiorii de Vede
 Unirea National College (Turnu Măgurele)
 Marin Preda Theoretical High School, Turnu Măgurele
 Zimnicea High School

Timiș County

 Constantin Diaconovici Loga National College (Timișoara)
 , Timișoara
 , Timișoara
 , Timișoara
 Jean Louis Calderon High School, Timișoara
 William Shakespeare High School, Timișoara
 Béla Bartók High School
 Nikolaus Lenau High School, Timișoara
 Dositej Obradović High School, Timișoara
 Vlad Țepeș High School, Timișoara
 Grigore Moisil High School (Timișoara)
 
 , Timișoara
 
 , Timișoara
 , Lugoj

Tulcea County
 Spiru Haret Dobrujan College, Tulcea

Vaslui County
 Gheorghe Roșca Codreanu National College, Bârlad
 Ioan Popescu Pedagogical High School, Bârlad
 Mihail Kogălniceanu High School, Vaslui

Vâlcea County

 Alexandru Lahovari National College, Râmnicu-Vâlcea
 Mircea cel Bătrân National College (Râmnicu Vâlcea)
 Matei Basarab Informatics National College, Râmnicu-Vâlcea
 Ferdinand I Technological High School, Râmnicu-Vâlcea
 Râmnicu-Vâlcea Economic College
 Râmnicu-Vâlcea Energy College
 Râmnicu-Vâlcea Forestry High School
 George Tarnea High School, Băbeni
 Petrache Poenaru Technological High School, Bălcești
 Preda Buzescu High School, Berbești
 Gheorghe Surdu Theoretical High School, Brezoi
 Călimănești Tourism High School 
 Gib Mihăescu National College, Drăgășani
 Brătianu Technological High School, Drăgășani
 Grădiștea Theoretical High School
 Constantin Brâncoveanu High School, Horezu
 Virgil Ierunca Theoretical High School, Lădești
 Măciuca Theoretical High School

Vrancea County

 Alexandru Ioan Cuza National College (Focșani)
 Unirea National College (Focșani)
 , Focșani
 Valeriu D. Cotea Technical College, Focșani
 Edmond Nicolau Technical College, Focșani
 Emil Botta National College, Adjud
 Gheorghe Balș Technical College, Adjud
 Duiliu Zamfirescu Theoretical High School, Odobești
 Odobești Technological High School
 Alexandru I. Cuza Technological High School, Panciu

References

Romania
Romania

Schools